Godefroid de Claire or Godefroid de Huy (born c. 1100; died c. 1173) was a goldsmith and enamelist.

Life and works
His main working period was 1130–1199. During this time, he worked in the area of Stavelot and the Meuse valley, in what is now Belgium.

He might have learned the art from Rainer of Huy.

His style was Mosan art, specialising in reliquary and iaphic art. His shrine of Pope Alexander I is preserved in the Royal Museums of Art and History.

It was suggested that he was the teacher of Nicholas of Verdun.

Attributed Works

References

External links 
 Around Godefroid de Claire

1100s births
1170s deaths
People of medieval Belgium
Belgian goldsmiths
Medieval artisans
12th-century people of the Holy Roman Empire
12th-century businesspeople